The Ogo Mountains, also known as the Galgodon Highlands, are a mountain range in Somaliland. They cross the Sanaag and Togdheer regions.

Ecology

Due to the Ogo Mountains' elevated, highland location in Somaliland, the range has an unexpectedly temperate climate. The mountains also catch the precipitation of the Indian Ocean's monsoon winds, resulting in a rainy season that lasts from June until mid-September.

Climate
Precipitation reaches a maximum in March, with a minimum of rainfall in August.

The data provided below derives from the Gudaado station. It illustrates a subtropical highland climate with strong continental Mediterranean characteristics (Köppen: "Cwb"), given the two marked wet seasons that span between March–May and September–November, albeit the latter being briefer and more subtle. The climatic situation here is most similar to the Altiplano region, due to its semi-arid patterns of rain, huge diurnal temperature variations, adjacence to the Somali desert, and seasonal variations that are neither too cold nor too hot in the extremes.

See also
 Lamadaya waterfalls

References

Sanaag
Togdheer
Mountain ranges of Somaliland
Somali montane xeric woodlands